Robert Elias Schapire is an American computer scientist, former David M. Siegel '83 Professor in the computer science department at Princeton University, and has recently moved to Microsoft Research. His primary specialty is theoretical and applied machine learning.

His work led to the development of the boosting ensemble algorithm used in machine learning. His PhD dissertation, The design and analysis of efficient learning algorithms, won him the ACM Doctoral Dissertation Award in 1991. Together with Yoav Freund, he invented the AdaBoost algorithm in 1996.  They both received the Gödel prize in 2003 for this work.

In 2014, Schapire was elected a member of the National Academy of Engineering for his contributions to machine learning through the invention and development of boosting algorithms. In 2016, he was elected to the National Academy of Sciences.

Personal life
His son, Zachary Schapire, recently graduated from his alma mater, Brown University. His daughter, Jeni Schapire, is a singer-songwriter in Nashville, TN and a graduate of Oberlin College. He is a self-proclaimed vegetarian.

Selected works

Books

References

External links
Robert Schapire's home page

Gödel Prize laureates
Princeton University faculty
Living people
Members of the United States National Academy of Engineering
Members of the United States National Academy of Sciences
Year of birth missing (living people)

Brown University alumni